The 1976 XII FIBA International Christmas Tournament "Trofeo Raimundo Saporta" was the 12th edition of the FIBA International Christmas Tournament. It took place at Sports City of Real Madrid Pavilion, Madrid, Spain, on 24, 25 and 26 December 1976 with the participations of Real Madrid (runners-up of the 1975–76 FIBA European Champions Cup), Tennessee Volunteers, Cavigal Nice and Africa Selection.

League stage

Day 1, December 24, 1976

|}

Day 2, December 25, 1976

|}

Day 3, December 26, 1976

|}

Final standings

References

1976–77 in European basketball
1976–77 in Spanish basketball